Pinehill may refer to:

New Zealand
Pinehill, New Zealand, a suburb of North Shore City in the Auckland region

United States
Pinehill, New Mexico, a census-designated place in Cibola County, New Mexico
The Pinehills, a residential and commercial development in Plymouth, Massachusetts
Pinehill Inn, a Registered Historic Place in Oregon, Illinois

See also
Pine Hill (disambiguation)